Pobuzke is an urban-type settlement in Holovanivsk Raion of Kirovohrad Oblast in Ukraine. It is located on the left bank of the Southern Bug (hence the name), at the border with Mykolaiv Oblast. Pobuzke hosts the administration of Pobuzke settlement hromada, one of the hromadas of Ukraine. Population:

Economy
Pobuzke Ferronickel Plant, a plant producing ferronickel, is located in the settlement.

Transportation
Nikel-Pobuzkyi railway station is located in the settlement. This is a cargo station serving the ferronickel plant. It is connected by railway with Pidhorodna. There is no passenger traffic.

Highway H24 which connects Holovanivsk and Pervomaisk runs close to the settlement.

References

Urban-type settlements in Holovanivsk Raion